Stare Pole is a village in Malbork County, Pomeranian Voivodeship, in northern Poland. It is the seat of the gmina (administrative district) called Gmina Stare Pole.

The village has a population of 1,834.

References

Villages in Malbork County